The 1979 Finnish motorcycle Grand Prix was the tenth round of the 1979 Grand Prix motorcycle racing season. It took place on the weekend of 27-29 July 1979 at the Imatra Circuit.

Classification

500 cc

References

Finnish motorcycle Grand Prix
Motorcycle Grand Prix
Finnish